Polesia, Polissya, Polesie, or Polesye is a natural and historical region in Eastern Europe, including part of Eastern Poland, the Belarus–Ukraine border region, and  part of Southwestern Russia.

Extent 
One of the largest forest areas on the continent, Polesia is located in the southwestern part of the Eastern-European Lowland, the Polesian Lowland. On the western side, Polesia originates at the crossing of the Bug River valley in Poland and the Pripyat River valley of Western Ukraine. The swampy areas of central Polesia are known as the Pinsk Marshes (after the major local city of Pinsk). Large parts of the region were contaminated after the Chernobyl disaster and the region now includes the Chernobyl Exclusion Zone and Polesie State Radioecological Reserve, named after the region.

Name 
The names Polesia/Polissia/Polesye, etc. may reflect the Slavic root les 'forest', and the Slavic prefix po- 'on, in, along'. Inhabitants of Polesia are called Polishchuks.

The term is not related to Poland, Polish, Pole, etc., which is ultimately derived from Old Slavic pole 'field'.

History 

In ancient times, the areas of today's western and west-central Polesia were inhabited by the people of the Milograd culture, the Neuri.

In the late Middle Ages Polesia became part of the Grand Duchy of Lithuania, following it into the Polish–Lithuanian Commonwealth (1569). Polesia was largely part of Poland from 1921 to 1939, when the country's largest provinces bore that name.Polesia has rarely been a separate administrative unit. However, there was a Polesie Voivodeship during the Second Polish Republic, as well as a Polesia Voblast in Byelorussian SSR. From 1931 to 1944, it was explicitly mentioned as constituent part of the short-lived (Byzantine Rite) Ukrainian Catholic Apostolic Exarchate of Volhynia, Polesia and Pidliashia. Since the end of World War II, the region of Polesie or Polesia has encompassed areas in eastern Poland, southern Belarus, northwestern Ukraine, and southwestern Russia.

 Geography 
Polesia is a marshy region lining the Pripyat River (Pripyat Marshes) in Southern Belarus (Brest, Pinsk, Kalinkavichy, Gomel), Northern Ukraine (in the Volyn, Rivne, Zhytomyr, Kyiv and Chernihiv Oblasts), and partly in Poland (Lublin) and Russia (Bryansk). It is a flatland within the drainage basins of the Western Bug and Prypyat rivers. The two rivers are connected by the Dnieper-Bug Canal, built during the reign of Stanislaus II of Poland, the last king of the Polish–Lithuanian Commonwealth.

Notable tributaries of the Pripyat are the Horyn, Stokhid, Styr, Ptsich, and Yaselda rivers. The largest towns in the Pripyat basin are Pinsk, Stolin, Davyd-Haradok. Huge marshes were reclaimed from the 1960s to the 1980s for farmland. The reclamation is believed to have harmed the environment along the course of the Pripyat.

This region suffered severely from the Chernobyl disaster. Huge areas were polluted by radioactive elements. The most polluted part includes the Chernobyl Exclusion Zone and the adjacent Polesie State Radioecological Reserve. Some other areas in the region are considered unsuitable for living as well.

 Tourism 
This and a wider area adjoining it (up to the Ukrainian border) make up the UNESCO-designated West Polesie Biosphere Reserve, which borders a similar reserve (the Shatskiy Biosphere Reserve) on the Ukrainian side. There is also a protected area called Pribuzhskoye-Polesie in the Belarusian part of the region.

The wooden architecture structures in the region were added to the UNESCO World Heritage Tentative List on 30 January 2004 in the Cultural category.

 See also 
 Museum of Ukrainian home icons
 Radomysl Castle
 Polesian Lowland
 UNESCO World Heritage Centre
 Western Polesie
 FC Polissya Zhytomyr

 Further reading 
 Пазинич В., Походження Поліських озер та параболічних дюн (Ukrainian)/Пазинич В.Г., Происхождение Полесских озер и параболических дюн (Russian)
 Zeitschrift für Ostmitteleuropaforschung, Heft 3/2019: Polesia: Modernity in the Marshlands. Interventions and Transformations at the European Periphery from the Nineteenth to the Twenty-first Century'' Online: Bd. 68 Nr. 3 (2019): Polesia: Modernity in the Marshlands. Interventions and Transformations at the European Periphery from the Nineteenth to the Twenty-first Century | Zeitschrift für Ostmitteleuropa-Forschung

Notes

References

External links 

 The Official Site of Radomysl Castle
 Polisia at the Encyclopedia of Ukraine
Origin of Polesie lakes and parabolic dunes

Divided regions
Historical regions in Belarus
Historical regions in Poland
Historical regions in Russia
Historical regions in Ukraine
Belarus–Ukraine border